Miguel Pérez may refer to:

Miguel Pérez de Almazán (died 1514), Spanish hidalgo
Miguel Pérez Cevallos (died 1681), Spanish bishop
Miguel Pérez Carreño (1904-1966), Venezuelan physician
Miguel Pérez (cyclist) (born 1934), Mexican Olympic cyclist
Miguel Pérez (wrestler) (1937–2005), Puerto Rican wrestler
Miguel Pérez (footballer, born 1945), Ecuadorian footballer
Miguel Pérez (footballer, born 1947), Spanish footballer
Miguel Perez (American actor) (born 1957), American television actor
Miguel Ángel Pérez Tello (born 1957), Spanish Paralympic cyclist and skier
Miguel Pérez Jr. (born 1966), Puerto Rican wrestler
Miguel Pérez (water polo) (born 1967), Spanish Olympic water polo player
Miguel Pérez Alvarado (born 1979), Spanish poet
Miguel Pérez (footballer, born 1980), Spanish footballer
Miguel Pérez (baseball) (born 1983), Venezuelan baseball player
Michu (born 1986), Spanish footballer born Miguel Pérez Cuesta
Miguel Pérez (Mexican actor) (born 1993), Mexican television actor
Miguel Perez (soccer, born 2005), American soccer midfielder

See also
José Miguel Pérez (disambiguation)